Régis Hervé Genaux (31 August 1973 – 8 November 2008) was a Belgian professional footballer who played as a right back.

During his career he represented three clubs in three countries, mainly Standard Liège and Udinese. He died at the young age of 35 from the effects of a pulmonary embolism.

Club career
After having started playing football with R. Charleroi SC, Genaux began his professional career aged 17 at Standard Liège, where he helped to win one Belgian Cup and achieved two Pro League runner-up places.

In 1996 Genaux moved to England, joining Coventry City. However, his spell at the club lasted just half a season, with only four Premier League appearances before he signed, in January 1997, with Italy's Udinese Calcio.

Due to persisting injuries during the most part of his career, Genaux retired at just 29, after having returned to Standard for a final season. Afterwards he moved into coaching, starting with the youths at R.A.A. Louviéroise and R.C.S. Verviétois; for a few months in 2006, he took the reins of third division side RFC Sérésien (formerly Seraing).

International career
Genaux played 22 times (being selected 27) with Belgium, the first being on 16 February 1992, in a friendly match against Tunisia, aged not yet 19. He seemed poised to be the successor of Eric Gerets in the Diables Rouges, although he was not picked up for the 1994 FIFA World Cup.

Genaux became a regular fixture in the following years, but Belgium failed to qualify for UEFA Euro 1996. With the arrival of Georges Leekens, he lost his place in the national team, and was also not selected for the 1998 World Cup in France at the expense of Éric Deflandre and Bertrand Crasson; regarded as one of the best right-backs in Belgium in the 90s, he would not attend any major international tournaments, also missing Euro 2000 due to injury.

Personal life
Genaux's brother, Terrence, was also a footballer, with the pair being distantly related to Vivica Genaux, a mezzo-soprano.
At Standard, alongside fellow internationals Philippe Léonard and Michaël Goossens, he was part of The Three Musketeers generation, hailed for their sporting talent but with a troublesome character (with Roberto Bisconti playing a smaller role).

Death
On 8 November 2008, Genaux died from heart failure due to a pulmonary embolism, whilst in his house. He was only 35.

Honours
Standard Liège
 Belgian Cup: 1992–93

Udinese
UEFA Intertoto Cup: 2000

References

External links

1973 births
2008 deaths
Sportspeople from Charleroi
Footballers from Hainaut (province)
Association football defenders
Belgian footballers
Belgian Pro League players
R. Charleroi S.C. players
Standard Liège players
Premier League players
Coventry City F.C. players
Serie A players
Udinese Calcio players
Belgium youth international footballers
Belgium under-21 international footballers
Belgium international footballers
Belgian expatriate footballers
Expatriate footballers in England
Expatriate footballers in Italy
Belgian expatriate sportspeople in Italy